Pseudotelphusa amelanchierella is a moth of the family Gelechiidae. It is found in North America, where it has been recorded from Ohio.

The wingspan is about 9.5-10.5 mm. The forewings are grey, rather evenly dusted with bluish white scales and with minute black spots at the base of the costa and at the base of the fold. There are blackish patches on the costa at one-fourth, the middle and two-thirds, the last the largest. At one-fourth there is an oblique row of three dots of raised black scales, the first just below the costa, but included in the blackish costal patch. Within the costa, but included in the second costal spot, is usually a minute and blacker raised dot, and beneath it on the disk and in the fold, raised black dots. Beneath the third costal spot is a pair of raised black dots at end of the cell. At the tornus there is a black or slightly darkened spot. All of the raised black dots are margined with a few brown scales. Except for these brown scales, there is an entire absence of brownish tint on the forewings. The hindwings are pale silvery grey, scarcely or not at all darkening toward the apex.

The larvae feed on the leaves of Amelanchier canadensis. They are pale greenish without markings. Pupation takes place in a silken cocoon between the leaves of the host plant.

References

Moths described in 1930
Pseudotelphusa